The 2016–17 Eastern Michigan Eagles men's basketball team represented Eastern Michigan University during the 2016–17 NCAA Division I men's basketball season. The Eagles, led by sixth-year head coach Rob Murphy, played their home games at the Convocation Center in Ypsilanti, Michigan as members of the West Division of the Mid-American Conference.

They finished the regular season 16–17, 7–11 in MAC play to finish in a tie for eighth place. Due to tiebreaking rules, they received the No. 8 seed in the MAC tournament. They advanced to the quarterfinals of the MAC Tournament, where they lost to Akron.

Previous season
The Eagles finished the 2015–16 season 18–15, 9–9 in MAC play to finish in a tie for third place in the West Division. They defeated Toledo in the first round of the MAC tournament before losing to Akron in the quarterfinals.

Departures

Incoming Transfers

Recruiting class of 2016

Roster

Schedule and results

|-
!colspan=9 style=| Non-conference regular season

|-
!colspan=9 style=| MAC regular season

|-
!colspan=9 style=| MAC tournament

See also
 2016–17 Eastern Michigan Eagles women's basketball team

References

Eastern Michigan Eagles men's basketball seasons
Eastern Michigan
Eastern Michigan Eagles men's basketball
Eastern Michigan Eagles men's basketball